The Royal Bolton Hospital is an acute general hospital in Farnworth, Greater Manchester. It is managed by the Bolton NHS Foundation Trust.

History

The hospital was established as a fever hospital and built adjacent to the 'Fishpool Workhouse' in 1872.

An isolation block was added in 1893 and a purpose-built infirmary, known as Townley's Hospital, was erected on the site in 1896. The workhouse buildings, by then known as the 'Fishpool Institute', became part of the hospital in 1913.

The hospital joined the National Health Service in 1948 and became Bolton District General Hospital in 1951. After the services of the Bolton Royal Infirmary transferred to Bolton District General Hospital in 1996, the latter facility became the Royal Bolton Hospital. The old 'Fishpool Institute' buildings were demolished in 2011.

In December 2014 it was reported that the hospital had a serious backlog of maintenance problems, amounting to £24.6 million, without which the crumbling concrete structural floor supports under a urology operating theatre could give way - with "dire" consequences. The trust applied for £30 million to upgrade its premises and redesign its information technology in May 2015. The heating and air conditioning systems  had reached the end of their useful life.  It was given a loan of £22.5 million and a grant of £7.5 million in September 2015.

Facilities
The Royal Bolton Hospital is one of the busiest NHS hospitals in the North West and was the busiest in Greater Manchester, having over 32,000 admissions, in 2007-08 year.

References

External links
  Bolton NHS Foundation Trust

NHS hospitals in England
Hospitals in Greater Manchester
Buildings and structures in the Metropolitan Borough of Bolton
Farnworth